Julia Vlassov (born August 29, 1990) is an American retired pair skater. She and partner Drew Meekins are the 2006 World Junior Champions.

Personal life
Vlassov was born in Saint Petersburg, Russia, the daughter of Aleksandr Vlasov, the 1977 World silver medalist and European bronze medalist in pairs. The family moved to the United States in 1994.

Career
Vlassov started skating at the age of 5. She competed as a single skater on the Juvenile and Intermediate levels before switching to pairs skating. She teamed up with Drew Meekins in 2002.

Following a successful junior career that was highlighted by medaling in every event they entered including Junior Grand Prix's, Junior Grand Prix Final, and the US National Championships, Vlassov and Meekins made their senior Grand Prix debut in the 2006-2007 season at 2006 Cup of China and 2006 NHK Trophy. They were assigned to two Grand Prix events for the 2007-2008 season; however, they were forced to withdraw from the 2007 Skate Canada International before the event began due to an injury to Meekins's shoulder which occurred during an attempted lift in practice. Vlassov and Meekins announced the end of their partnership on November 8, 2007.

Programs 
(with Meekins)

Competitive highlights
(with Meekins)

References

External links

 Official Site

American female pair skaters
1990 births
Living people
Figure skaters from Saint Petersburg
World Junior Figure Skating Championships medalists
Russian emigrants to the United States
21st-century American women